Simone Person is a multi-genre author, poet and scholar based in Indiana from Adrian, Michigan. In 2018, Person became the Prose Editor for Honeysuckle Press and was named a Pink Door Writing Retreat Fellow in 2019. Her writing has appeared or is forthcoming in The Conium Review, The Rumpus, Thrush, Atticus Review, and elsewhere. Person's first chapbook collection Dislocate won the 2017 Honeysuckle Press Chapbook Contest. Bhanu Kapil, who judged the 2017 contest, praised the collection for "its figural imaginary," and described it as "a work of abject longing, set in temperatures that don't easily regulate or normalize." Person's second chapbook collection Smoke Girl won the 2018 Diode Editions Chapbook Contest, judged by Founding Editor Patty Paine. About Person's latest collection, Rachel Wiley said, Smoke Girl "will look you in the eye and exhale thick truth that will either warm you or choke you." Most recently, Person won the 2020 Eric Hoffer Chapbook Category Award and was shortlisted for the Eric Hoffer Grand Prize.

Awards 
2020 Eric Hoffer Grand Prize Short List.
2020 Eric Hoffer Chapbook Category Award
2018 Diode Editions Chapbook Prize
2017 Honeysuckle Press Chapbook Award

References

External links 
 Official Website

Living people
21st-century American writers
African-American poets
American LGBT poets
Queer writers
Year of birth missing (living people)
21st-century African-American writers